Khadzhimurad Magomedov (born 24 February 1974, Makhachkala, Dagestan ASSR) is a Russian wrestler and Olympic champion in Freestyle wrestling.

International career
Magomedov competed at the 1996 Summer Olympics in Atlanta where he received a gold medal in Freestyle wrestling, the middleweight class.

Magomedov also became world champion at the 2001 World Wrestling Championships. He won a silver medal in 1999, and in 2 other appearances, 1997 and 1998, he finished in 4th place. Other notable achievements include winning the European Championships  in 1997 and the World Military Games in 1999.

References

External links
 

1974 births
Living people
Sportspeople from Makhachkala
Avar people
Olympic wrestlers of Russia
Wrestlers at the 1996 Summer Olympics
Russian male sport wrestlers
Olympic gold medalists for Russia
Olympic medalists in wrestling
World Wrestling Championships medalists
Medalists at the 1996 Summer Olympics
European Wrestling Championships medalists